Wenonah is a borough in Gloucester County, in the U.S. state of New Jersey. As of the 2020 United States census, the borough's population was 2,283, an increase of five people (+0.2%) from the 2010 census count of 2,278, which in turn reflected a decline of 39 (−1.7%) from the 2,317 counted in the 2000 census.

Wenonah was established as a Borough by the New Jersey Legislature on March 10, 1883, from portions of Deptford Township, based on the results of a referendum that was held two days earlier. The borough was named for the mother of Hiawatha in Henry Wadsworth Longfellow's poem The Song of Hiawatha.

It is a dry town where alcohol cannot be bought or sold legally.

The borough had the 29th-highest property tax rate in New Jersey, with an equalized rate of 4.120% in 2020, compared to 3.212% in the county as a whole and a statewide average of 2.279%.

History

Wenonah was founded in 1871 by Philadelphia businessmen as a country resort, drawn by its location along the Mantua Creek and on the West Jersey Railroad. Over the next 40 years, numerous dams were installed to create recreational lakes. From 1902 until the Great Depression, Wenonah Military Academy, a private military school, trained cadets there.

Throughout its history, Wenonah has been almost exclusively a residential area. Over 21% of the borough's land area is conservation land, which is protected by ordinance from development.

More than 200 properties in Wenonah were damaged, the largest number of any municipality hit by the tornado.

Geography
According to the U.S. Census Bureau, the borough had a total area of 1.01 square miles (2.62 km2), including 1.00 square miles (2.58 km2) of land and 0.02 square miles (0.04 km2) of water (1.58%).

Wenonah borders Deptford Township and Mantua Township.

Demographics

2010 census

The Census Bureau's 2006–2010 American Community Survey showed that (in 2010 inflation-adjusted dollars) median household income was $103,403 (with a margin of error of +/− $8,030) and the median family income was $112,891 (+/− $12,345). Males had a median income of $78,417 (+/− $11,006) versus $64,205 (+/− $16,821) for females. The per capita income for the borough was $47,743 (+/− $6,172). About 1.1% of families and 1.4% of the population were below the poverty line, including 3.4% of those under age 18 and none of those age 65 or over.

2000 census
As of the 2000 census, there were 2,317 people, 844 households, and 652 families residing in the borough. The racial makeup of the borough was 97.546% White, 1.084% African American, 0.093% Native American, 0.65% Asian, and 0.652% from two or more races. Hispanic or Latino of any race were 0.731% of the population.

There were 844 households, out of which 35.3% had children under the age of 18 living with them, 66.4% were married couples living together, 8.6% had a female householder with no husband present, and 22.7% were non-families. 19.7% of all households were made up of individuals, and 7.1% had someone living alone who was 65 years of age or older. The average household size was 2.70 and the average family size was 3.13.

In the borough, the population was spread out, with 25.9% under the age of 18, 5.1% from 18 to 24, 26.0% from 25 to 44, 29.1% from 45 to 64, and 13.8% who were 65 years of age or older. The median age was 41 years. For every 100 females, there were 94.9 males. For every 100 females age 18 and over, there were 93.0 males.

The median income for a household in the borough was $71,625, and the median income for a family was $82,505. Males had a median income of $57,381 versus $37,500 for females. The per capita income for the borough was $34,116. About 2.0% of families and 2.5% of the population were below the poverty line, including 2.8% of those under age 18 and 4.3% of those age 65 or over.

Government

Local government
Wenonah is governed under the Borough form of New Jersey municipal government, which is used in 218 of 564 municipalities statewide, making it the most common form of government in New Jersey. The governing body is comprised of a Mayor and a Borough Council, with all positions elected at-large on a partisan basis as part of the November general election. A Mayor is elected directly by the voters to a four-year term of office. The Borough Council is comprised of six members elected to serve three-year terms on a staggered basis, with two seats coming up for election each year in a three-year cycle. The Borough form of government used by Wenonah is a "weak mayor / strong council" government in which council members act as the legislative body with the mayor presiding at meetings and voting only in the event of a tie. The mayor can veto ordinances subject to an override by a two-thirds majority vote of the council. The mayor makes committee and liaison assignments for council members, and most appointments are made by the mayor with the advice and consent of the council.

In May 2016, the borough council selected Daniel Cox to fill the vacant seat expiring in December 2018 that had been held by John F. Howard until his death the previous month.

, Wenonah's mayor is Republican John R. Dominy, whose term of office ends December 31, 2022. Members of the Wenonah Borough Council are Council President Daniel Cox (D, 2024), Jonathan Barbato (D, 2023), Jessica Doheny (D, 2022), Anthony Fini (D, 2020), Peter Y. Fu (D, 2022) and Susan Mayer (R, 2024).

Federal, state, and county representation
Wenonah is located in the 1st Congressional District and is part of New Jersey's 5th state legislative district. Prior to the 2011 reapportionment following the 2010 Census, Wenonah had been in the 3rd state legislative district.

Politics
As of March 2011, there were a total of 1,748 registered voters in Wenonah, of which 571 (32.7%) were registered as Democrats, 461 (26.4%) were registered as Republicans and 714 (40.8%) were registered as Unaffiliated. There were 2 voters registered as either Libertarians or Greens.

In the 2012 presidential election, Democrat Barack Obama received 53.0% of the vote (727 cast), ahead of Republican Mitt Romney with 45.1% (619 votes), and other candidates with 1.9% (26 votes), among the 1,383 ballots cast by the borough's 1,780 registered voters (11 ballots were spoiled), for a turnout of 77.7%. In the 2008 presidential election, Democrat Barack Obama received 53.3% of the vote (775 cast), ahead of Republican John McCain with 44.5% (647 votes) and other candidates with 1.3% (19 votes), among the 1,455 ballots cast by the borough's 1,786 registered voters, for a turnout of 81.5%. In the 2004 presidential election, Democrat John Kerry received 49.8% of the vote (715 ballots cast), outpolling Republican George W. Bush with 47.9% (688 votes) and other candidates with 1.4% (25 votes), among the 1,436 ballots cast by the borough's 1,769 registered voters, for a turnout percentage of 81.2.

In the 2013 gubernatorial election, Republican Chris Christie received 61.1% of the vote (563 cast), ahead of Democrat Barbara Buono with 36.3% (334 votes), and other candidates with 2.6% (24 votes), among the 933 ballots cast by the borough's 1,748 registered voters (12 ballots were spoiled), for a turnout of 53.4%. In the 2009 gubernatorial election, Republican Chris Christie received 44.3% of the vote (469 ballots cast), ahead of Democrat Jon Corzine with 41.2% (436 votes), Independent Chris Daggett with 12.3% (130 votes) and other candidates with 0.8% (8 votes), among the 1,059 ballots cast by the borough's 1,775 registered voters, yielding a 59.7% turnout.

Education
Wenonah School District serves public school students in kindergarten through sixth grade at Wenonah Elementary School. As of the 2018–19 school year, the district, comprised of one school, had an enrollment of 177 students and 19.8 classroom teachers (on an FTE basis), for a student–teacher ratio of 9.0:1. In the 2016–17 school year, Wenonah had the 37th smallest enrollment of any school district in the state, with 177 students.

For seventh through twelfth grades, public school students attend Gateway Regional High School, a regional public high school that also serves students from the boroughs of National Park, Westville and Woodbury Heights, as part of the Gateway Regional High School District. As of the 2018–19 school year, the high school had an enrollment of 879 students and 81.5 classroom teachers (on an FTE basis), for a student–teacher ratio of 10.8:1.

Students from across the county are eligible to apply to attend Gloucester County Institute of Technology, a four-year high school in Deptford Township that provides technical and vocational education. As a public school, students do not pay tuition to attend the school.

Transportation

Roads and highways

County Route 553 and County Route 632 are the main roadways serving Wenonah.

Public transportation
NJ Transit bus service between Sewell and Philadelphia is available on the 412 route.

The borough is the site of a planned stop on the Glassboro–Camden Line, an  diesel multiple unit light rail system projected for completion in 2019. However, as of 2019, completion is not expected until 2025.

Notable people

People who were born in, residents of, or otherwise closely associated with Wenonah include:
 B.C. Camplight (born 1979, as Brian Christinzio), singer-songwriter
 Michael Capuzzo (born 1957), author of Close to Shore: A True Story of Terror in an Age of Innocence and four-time Pulitzer Prize nominee
 Edward Everett Grosscup (1860–1933), chairman of the New Jersey Democratic State Committee from 1911 to 1919 and Treasurer of the State of New Jersey from 1913 to 1915
 Carl Hausman (born 1953), journalist, educator and commentator, who is the author of Lies We Live By
 Michael Pellegrino (born 2001), soccer player for the University of Notre Dame who played for Bethlehem Steel FC
 Isaac Pursell (1853–1910), architect
 Grover C. Richman Jr. (1911–1983), lawyer who served as United States Attorney for the District of New Jersey from 1951 to 1953 and New Jersey Attorney General from 1954 to 1958
 Joseph C. Salema, New Jersey Governor James Florio's former Chief of Staff who resigned in the Spring of 1993 amid accusations of accepting payments in a pay to play scandal
 Joe Solecki (born 1993), professional mixed martial artist competing for the Ultimate Fighting Championship
 Steve Squyres (born 1957), astronomer and principal investigator of the Mars Exploration Rover Mission
 Tim Squyres (born 1959), film editor of Crouching Tiger, Hidden Dragon, Hulk, Life of Pi and Syriana, among others
 Bob Steuber (1921–1996), NFL football player who was elected to the College Football Hall of Fame in 1971

References

External links

 Official Wenonah website

 
1883 establishments in New Jersey
Borough form of New Jersey government
Boroughs in Gloucester County, New Jersey
Populated places established in 1883